Félix Padrón (born 1 December 1936) is a Cuban gymnast. He competed in eight events at the 1964 Summer Olympics.

References

1936 births
Living people
Cuban male artistic gymnasts
Olympic gymnasts of Cuba
Gymnasts at the 1964 Summer Olympics
Place of birth missing (living people)
Pan American Games medalists in gymnastics
Pan American Games bronze medalists for Cuba
Gymnasts at the 1963 Pan American Games
20th-century Cuban people
21st-century Cuban people